This is a list of seasons completed by the Buffalo Bulls football team of the National Collegiate Athletic Association (NCAA) Division I Football Bowl Subdivision (FBS). Buffalo's first football team was fielded in 1894.

Buffalo originally competed as a football independent. Following the 1970 season, Buffalo's football team was discontinued for six seasons, before being reinstated as a Division III team in 1977. Buffalo competed as a I-AA team for six seasons before joining the I-A's Mid-American Conference in 1999, of which it has been a member since.

Seasons
Statistics correct as of the end of the 2018-19 college football season

References

Buffalo

Buffalo Bulls football seasons